Curtis Allen Myden (born December 31, 1973) is a former breaststroke and medley swimmer from Canada, who competed at three consecutive Summer Olympics in 1992, 1996 and 2000.  He won a total number of three medals at the Olympics, all of them bronze.  Myden was one of Canada's leading swimmers in the 1990s.  He was coached by Canadian coach Deryk Snelling.

He is an orthopaedic surgeon in the Yukon.

See also
 List of Commonwealth Games medallists in swimming (men)
 List of Olympic medalists in swimming (men)

References
 Canadian Olympic Committee
 Bio on FINA-website

External links
 Curtis Myden at Swimming Canada
 
 
 
 

1973 births
Living people
Calgary Dinos players
Canadian male breaststroke swimmers
Canadian male medley swimmers
Commonwealth Games silver medallists for Canada
Medalists at the FINA World Swimming Championships (25 m)
Medalists at the 1996 Summer Olympics
Medalists at the 2000 Summer Olympics
Olympic bronze medalists for Canada
Olympic bronze medalists in swimming
Olympic swimmers of Canada
Swimmers from Calgary
Swimmers at the 1992 Summer Olympics
Swimmers at the 1996 Summer Olympics
Swimmers at the 2000 Summer Olympics
Swimmers at the 1995 Pan American Games
Swimmers at the 1999 Pan American Games
Swimmers at the 1994 Commonwealth Games
World Aquatics Championships medalists in swimming
Pan American Games gold medalists for Canada
Commonwealth Games medallists in swimming
Pan American Games medalists in swimming
Goodwill Games medalists in swimming
Competitors at the 1998 Goodwill Games
Medalists at the 1995 Pan American Games
Medalists at the 1999 Pan American Games
Medallists at the 1994 Commonwealth Games